Jose G. Dorea is a professor at the University of Brasilia's department of nutritional sciences. He obtained his DVM from the Rural University of Pernambuco, and has an MS and a PhD from the University of Massachusetts Amherst in Nutritional Biochemistry. He has published over 170 peer-reviewed papers, mostly in the field of heavy metals toxicology. He has provided consulting services to the International Atomic Energy Agency, and serves as an editor of a number of scientific journals, including the Journal of Pediatric Biochemistry. Dorea has published a number of papers regarding the safety of thimerosal-containing vaccines.

In addition, Dorea has conducted research concluding that miners in the Amazon exposed to the mercury used to extract gold did not suffer from mercury poisoning as a result.

Selected publications

References

Year of birth missing (living people)
Living people
Brazilian toxicologists
University of Massachusetts Amherst alumni